Edwin is a 1724 tragedy by the British writer George Jeffreys.

The original cast included Anthony Boheme as Edwin, Lacy Ryan as Leolin, Charles Hulett as Tudor, Thomas Walker as Albert, James Quin as Gomel, Richard Diggs as Morvid and Anne Parker as Adeliza.

References

Bibliography
 Burling, William J. A Checklist of New Plays and Entertainments on the London Stage, 1700-1737. Fairleigh Dickinson Univ Press, 1992.
 Nicoll, Allardyce. A History of Early Eighteenth Century Drama: 1700-1750. CUP Archive, 1927.

1724 plays
British plays
Tragedy plays
West End plays